Il était une fois was a popular French musical group fronted by Joëlle Mogensen as lead vocals. Formed in Paris in 1972, it included besides Mogensen, Serge Koolenn, Richard Dewitte, Lionel Gaillardin, Bruno Walker and Christian Burguière. Walker and Burguière were later replaced by Jean-Louis Dronne and Daniel Schnitzer. The band was signed to the Pathé Marconi label.

The very popular band broke up in 1979 when Joëlle Mogensen left, just three years from her sudden death in 1982 at the age of 29.

The band released 4 studio albums and a great number of singles including "J'ai encore rêvé d'elle" that sold more than 1 million copies. A number of compilation albums have been released later.

Discography

Albums
1972: Il était une fois
1975: Ils vécurent heureux
1977: Tourne la page
1978: Pomme
Compilation albums
1992: Il était une fois - Les plus belles fois
1994: Il était une fois - Leurs plus belles chansons
1996: Le meilleur de
1998: 20 chansons d'or
2000: Anthologie
2002: Essentials
2007: Platinum Collection
2007: Best of - La légende
2012: Best of 2012

Singles
1972: "Rien qu'un ciel"
1972: "Les filles du mercredi"
1973: "Que fais-tu ce soir après dîner?"
1973: "C'était l'année dernière"
1973: "Quand tu partiras"
1974: "Compte sur tes doigts"
1975: "J'ai encore rêvé d'elle"
1975: "Viens faire un tour sous la pluie"
1976: "Toi et la musique"
1976: "Je suis mélodie"
1977: "Il a juste besoin d'un bateau"
1977: "Tourne la page"
1978: "Pomme"
1979: "La clé des coeurs"

References

External links
Discogs.com: Il était une fois page

Musical groups from Paris
Musical groups established in 1972
Musical groups disestablished in 1979